Kerala State IT Mission (KSITM) is part of the Department of Information Technology, Government of Kerala. Its headquarter is at Thiruvananthapuram. Kerala State IT Mission is a team of professionals from the industry and the Government and is headed by the Director, with the Secretary-IT as the Chairman.

The Governing body of KSITM is chaired by the Hon’ble Minister for IT.  The Principal Secretary – IT is the Chairman of the Executive Committee of KSITM. The Director KSITM is the Convener of the meetings of the General Body and Executive Committee.

KSITM performs diverse roles including, e-governance and development of human resources, disseminating information across citizens and Government, interfacing between Government and industry, bridging digital divide, investor interactions and achieving speed and transparency in governance. The activity of thrust is e-governance; conceptualization and implementation have been guided by citizen centricity and enhancing citizens’ efficiency. KSITM has a staff strength of about 150 plus employees.

History
It was established in 1999 under the Department of Information Technology, Government of Kerala for providing managerial support for various initiatives for the government. It is a Society registered under the Travancore Cochin Literary Scientific & Charitable Societies Registration Act (Act 12 of 1955).

See also
www.itmission.kerala.gov.in

External links
 www.itmission.kerala.gov.in
 Awards

Government of Kerala
E-government in India
State agencies of Kerala
1999 establishments in Kerala
Government agencies established in 1999